Grey House may refer to:

Places
MDenmark
 Greu House, a building in the Carlsberg district of Copenhagen
in the United States (by state)
Zane Grey Estate, Altadena, California, NRHP-listed
Zane Grey House, Lackawaxen, Pennsylvania, NRHP-listed

Other
The Grey House, a 1926 German silent film
Grey House Publishing company
Gray House (Kraków), Płaszów Nazi concentration camp head's villa (portrayed in movie Schindler's List)

See also
Gray House (disambiguation)
Greystone (disambiguation)
Grey Columns, Tuskegee, Alabama, listed on the NRHP in Macon County, Alabama
Grey Towers Castle, Glenside, Pennsylvania, NRHP-listed